Mainliner Sonic is the third studio album by Mainliner, released on May 20, 1997 by Charnel Music.

Track listing

Personnel 
Adapted from the Mainliner Sonic liner notes.
 Kawabata Makoto – electric guitar
 Asahito Nanjo – vocals, bass guitar, production
 Tatsuya Yoshida – drums

Release history

References

External links 
 

1997 albums
Charnel Music albums
Mainliner (band) albums